Romone Alexander Adolphus Rose (born 19 January 1990) is an English footballer who last played as a midfielder or defender for Hungerford Town.

Career
Rose was born in Reading, Berkshire. He began his career as a trainee with Queens Park Rangers (QPR). He was a member of the Rangers' under-18 team that won the Youth Alliance League title in 2007, but in need of first team experience was loaned to Isthmian League AFC Wimbledon in February 2008. He returned to Rangers towards the end of the season and made his first team debut as a second half as a substitute for Hogan Ephraim against West Bromwich Albion on 4 May 2008. He joined Conference National side Histon on a month's loan in November, but played just once, as a substitute for Jamie Barker in Histon's 3–1 win away to Stevenage Borough. He returned to Rangers and on 13 January 2009 played as a substitute (for Gavin Mahon) as Rangers lost 2–1 after extra time away to Burnley in the FA Cup.

Next season, Rose joined Northampton Town on 5 August for a month. He made his Northampton debut in a 2–0 loss against Southampton in the League Cup on 11 August 2009. His only league appearance came when came off the bench in a 1–0 loss to Chesterfield.

On 8 October 2009 he was again sent out on loan, to Cheltenham Town, making his debut for them two days later against Accrington Stanley. He only made one appearance for the club before asking to return to QPR.

On 22 October 2010 Rose signed a three-month loan deal with Torquay United, making his debut on 23 October in a 1–1 draw at Gillingham. On 30 October 2010, Rose scored his first goal since on loan for AFC Wimbledon in a 3–1 win over Morecambe.

After his release from QPR, Rose joined Thai club Muangthong United and was handed the 11 shirt. Rose made one appearance for the club before being released. In January 2012, he joined Newport County on non-contract terms. On 12 May 2012, Rose played for Newport County in the 2012 FA Trophy Final at Wembley Stadium which Newport lost 2–0 to York City. He left Newport County at the end of the 2011–12 season. Rose signed for Isthmian League side Wealdstone on 19 November 2012.

Rose signed for Hemel Hempstead Town in February 2013, and then on 21 March 2013, he signed for Conference South side Maidenhead United.

On 23 August 2013, after playing in a number of pre-season friendlies, Rose signed for Conference South side Eastleigh. The contract was terminated by mutual consent in January 2014.

After a spell with Staines, Rose signed for Droylsden on 14 January 2015 and then  Southern Division One Central side Marlow later in the same month.

He started the 2016–17 season at Wealdstone, and shortly after he signed on non-contract dual registration terms with Basingstoke Town. Further moves include Gosport Borough in January 2017, Slough Town in February 2017 and Hayes & Yeading United in March 2017.

Rose was on trial before the 2017–18 season at Brighton-based National League South side Whitehawk, managed by his former Newport County boss Jimmy Dack and secured a deal, assisted by a great goal scored in a pre-season friendly against Charlton Athletic U23. Rose scored his first goal for The Hawks in a 2–6 defeat at Bognor Regis Town in August 2017, establishing himself in the first team and appearing as both a midfielder and full-back.

He joined Hungerford Town for the 2018–19 campaign.

References

External links
Romone Rose player profile at qpr.co.uk
Romone Rose player profile at afcwimbledon.co.uk

1990 births
Living people
Sportspeople from Reading, Berkshire
English footballers
Association football forwards
Queens Park Rangers F.C. players
AFC Wimbledon players
Histon F.C. players
Northampton Town F.C. players
Cheltenham Town F.C. players
Torquay United F.C. players
Newport County A.F.C. players
Wealdstone F.C. players
Hemel Hempstead Town F.C. players
Maidenhead United F.C. players
Eastleigh F.C. players
Droylsden F.C. players
Staines Town F.C. players
Marlow F.C. players
Basingstoke Town F.C. players
Gosport Borough F.C. players
Slough Town F.C. players
Hayes & Yeading United F.C. players
Whitehawk F.C. players
English Football League players
Black British sportspeople
National League (English football) players
Southern Football League players
Expatriate footballers in Thailand
Footballers from Berkshire